Água Quente River may refer to:

 Água Quente River (Maranhão), Brazil
 Água Quente River (Paraná), Brazil